Frankenslime is a 2021 picture book written by Joy Keller and illustrated by Ashley Belote. The book was published on July 13, 2021 by Feiwel & Friends, an imprint of Macmillan Publishers.

Plot 
A young slime scientist is surprised when her latest creation comes to life in Frankenslime, a funny and clever picture book twist on Frankenstein.

Victoria Franken is a slime scientist. Her experiments lead to amazing slimes. Until, one dark and stormy night, her latest experiment goes awry and her newest creation comes to life.

References 

2021 children's books
American picture books
Feiwel & Friends books